Joaquín Miguel Elizalde y Díaz (August 2, 1896 – February 9, 1965) was a Filipino diplomat and businessman.

Personal life
Elizalde was born on August 2, 1896, in Manila, the eldest child of José Joaquín Elizalde (who was the Philippine-born son of Joaquín Marcelino Elizalde y Yrisarry, an immigrant from Elizondo in Navarre, Spain) and Carmen Díaz y Moreau (who was from Spain). His siblings were Juan Miguel, Ángel, Manuel ("Manolo"), Federico ("Fred") and Carmenchu.

He was educated at St. Joseph's College, London, and Dr. Schmidt's Institute in St. Gallen, Switzerland.

Elizalde was married to Elena von Kauffmann in 1924 and had two daughters, Cecilia and Elenita. The couple divorced in 1957. 

He later married Susan Magalona (born Susana Clarita Magalona y Gayoso, 1921-2014), daughter of Philippine senator Enrique Magalona and sister of Filipino actor Pancho Magalona. The couple had two children, Maria Theresa ("Tracey") and Juan Miguel ("J.M.", died 2007).

Business career
In 1936, Elizalde and his brothers established Elizalde & Company, Inc. after acquiring the major businesses of Ynchausti y Compañía, among them Ynchausti Shipping, Tanduay, YCO Paints and Floor Wax, and the Central Azucarera de La Carlota and Central  Azucarera de Pilar (now Capiz Sugar Central) sugar refineries. 

Elizalde was the company's first president. After World War II, he decided to focus on his diplomatic career and was succeeded as president of the company by his brother Manolo.

Diplomatic career

Elizalde became an economic adviser to President Manuel L. Quezon in 1937 and 1938. He became a member of the National Economic Council 1937–1941 and 1952 and 1953, and of the Joint Preparatory Committee on Philippine Affairs in 1936 and 1937. He was also a member of the Council of State 1936 to 1941 and 1952 to 1953 and served as Major of the Cavalry Reserve, Philippine Army.

As Resident Commissioner to the U.S. House of Representatives
Elizalde was appointed Resident Commissioner to the U.S. House of Representatives on September 29, 1938, to fill the vacancy caused by the resignation of Quintin Paredes and served until his resignation on August 9, 1944. He became a member of the war cabinet of President Quezon in 1941.

As International Monetary Fund governor
In 1946, he became a member of the board of governors of the International Monetary Fund and of the International Bank for Reconstruction and Development until 1950 and was the Philippine ambassador to the United States from July 6, 1946, until January 1952.

He was the first of only two former US congressmen to later serve as an ambassador from another country.

Secretary of Foreign Affairs under President Quirino
He also served as Secretary of Foreign Affairs of the Republic of the Philippines from 1952 to 1953, under the administration of President Elpidio Quirino and an economic adviser to the Philippine Mission at the United Nations, with the rank of Ambassador from 1956 to 1965. He represented the Philippines at the coronation of Elizabeth II on June 2, 1953.

Polo
He was an avid polo player together with his brothers, Juan Miguel, Ángel and Manolo. In January 1937, the Elizalde brothers inaugurated the Los Tamaraos Polo Club in Tambo, Parañaque after resigning their memberships in the Manila Polo Club in protest to the rejection of the membership application of Manuel Nieto, aide-de-camp of Philippine President Manuel L. Quezon. The Elizalde brothers proposed and seconded Nieto's membership application.

Retirement and death
Elizalde resided in Moreland Farm, Adamstown, Frederick County, Maryland, which he acquired in 1949. He died on February 9, 1965, and was buried at St. Joseph Church cemetery, Carrollton Manor, Frederick County, Maryland.

See also
Resident Commissioner of the Philippines
Department of Foreign Affairs (Philippines)
List of Hispanic and Latino Americans in the United States Congress

References

External links

1896 births
1965 deaths
20th-century American politicians
Elizalde, Joaquinmiguel
Filipino people of Spanish descent
Filipino people of Basque descent
Hispanic and Latino American members of the United States Congress
Members of the United States Congress of Filipino descent
People from Manila
Quezon administration cabinet members
Quirino administration cabinet members
Philippine Army personnel
Elizalde, Joaquinmiguel
Secretaries of Foreign Affairs of the Philippines